Marc Petrie (born 2 March 1990) is a Scottish cricketer. He made his One Day International debut against Canada in 2009.

References

1990 births
Living people
Scottish cricketers
Scotland One Day International cricketers
Cricketers from Dundee
Wicket-keepers